This is the list of cathedrals in Malta sorted by denomination.

Roman Catholic 
Cathedrals of the Roman Catholic Archdiocese of Malta:
 St. Paul's Metropolitan Cathedral in Mdina
 St. John's Co-Cathedral in Valletta

Cathedral of the Roman Catholic Diocese of Gozo
 Cathedral of the Assumption of the Blessed Virgin Mary in Victoria, Gozo

Anglican
Cathedral of the Diocese of Gibraltar in Europe:
St. Paul's Pro-Cathedral in Valletta

See also

List of cathedrals

References

Cathedrals in Malta
Malta
Cathedrals
Cathedrals